Tal Itzhaki (born March 1, 1956) is an Israeli theatre designer and director of the Academy of Performing Arts, Tel Aviv, a translator of plays and prose into Hebrew, and a peace activist.

Biography
Tal Itzhaki was born 1 March 1956 in Tel Aviv, Israel, to Dr Yedidya Itzhaki, architect and Professor Emeritus of Hebrew Literature at Bar-Ilan University and Rina Itzhaki, educator at the Kibbutzim College of Education. She is married to Israeli Professor of theatre at the University of Haifa and translator of drama and poetry Avraham Oz.

Education
Itzhaki earned a Senior Art Teacher degree from the HaMidrasha School of Art (now HaMidrasha – Faculty of the Arts of Beit Berl College), Israel (1977), where she studied (among others) under painters such as Raffi Lavie, Eliahu Gat, Yair Garbuz and Shlomo Vitkin; and a B.A. in theatre design (1982) from Tel Aviv University, where she studied under designers such as Lydia Pincus-Gani, Eli Sinai and Ben-Tzion Munitz. She is currently a PhD candidate in Theatre at Tel Aviv University

Career
Tal Itzhaki has been the director of the Academy of Performing Arts, Tel Aviv since its establishment in 2010. She taught at Tel Aviv University Theatre Department, at the WIZO Haifa Academy of Design and Education and served as Senior Lecturer at the Sapir Academic College. She founded the program of theatre design at the Department of Theatre at the University of Haifa which she headed for 9 years (1996-2004). Between 2003 and 2005 she was a visiting artist at Columbia University, New York, where she designed and produced, together with fellow director Amit Gazit, productions such as Hanoch Levin's Luggage Packers, and co-authored  "Neighbors", an adapted "contamination" collage of Levin's plays and "Xandra compelled to speak", a theatrical piece based on Euripides' Trojan Women and texts by 16 other authors, classical and modern.

TV
Itzhaki also designed TV shows, among them "The Ya'acov Shabtai Songs Show," (1997); "Homage to Kibbutzim," (1997), and others.

Other Activities
Together with fellow designer Moshe Sternfeld, playwright Hanoch Levin and others, Itzhaki was one of the initiators and founders of the first Fringe Centre in Tel Aviv. She served for many years the General Secretary of AMBI, the Israeli organization of stage designers, curated numerous stage design exhibitions in Israel and abroad, among them six exhibitions of Israeli stage design at the Prague Quadrennial (1991-2011)
and the pioneering and much acclaimed and attended "Fashion Show", a gigantic retrospective exhibition of the history of stage and costume design in Israel at the large foyers of the Jerusalem Theatre (2008-9). Itzhaki has published articles on scenography in professional and academic journals and books, and organized international conferences on the subject. She was the Israeli delegate on the professional committees of OISTAT, the International Organisation of Scenographers, Theatre Architects and Technicians, and was active in IFTR, the international federation of theatre research. Itzhaki lectured, led seminars and workshop and served as member of professional jury in international design competitions, all those in Prague, Amsterdam, United States, Antwerp, Lisbon, Ebora, Munich, Jaipur, Seoul, Gothenburg and elsewhere. She served twice as a juror at the Acco Festival of Alternative Israeli Theatre, where she, like many theatre personalities of her generation, started their professional careers.

Translations
Tal Itzhaki has translated numerous plays into the Hebrew, among them María Irene Fornés' The Conduct of Life, Sarah Daniels Neaptide, Jonathan Harvey's Beautiful Thing, David Hare's Secret Rapture, Caryl Churchill's Cloud Nine and Seven Jewish Girls, Arnold Wesker's Shylock, Bernard Slade's Same Time Next Year, Anne Devlin's Ourselves Alone, Nick Dear's The Art of Success, and many others. She has translated Winston Churchill's collection Never Give In.

Awards and Citations
Tal Itzhaki has designed sets, costume, puppets and masks for over 250 shows in theatres, dance companies, and theatre schools in Israel and abroad. Her work won several awards and citations.

Her design for "Woman from the Earth" at the Acco Festival of Alternative Israeli Theatre, 1981, won her the First Prize for design. "The fair, celestial set of Tali Itzhaki, with sown angels, and silhouettes of Cherubim and Seraphim placed on stage, is wonderful", wrote critic Giora Manor at the daily "Al Hamishmar"; and Amir Orian writes in the weekly "Ha'ir":"The set of Tali Itzhaki is simple and serves well the basic approach of the production. Yet it is also impressive in its beauty in the combined placement of the various figures of Lilith in shades of red against a white background."

On her design for "The Pledge of Troth" at the Acco Festival of Alternative Israeli Theatre and The Library Theatre, Maariv (newspaper) reviewer Sarit Fuchs has written: " "The Pledge of Troth"... turned, owing to a beautiful classical stage fermentation, into a sensual experience, a dream experience... The sea of Jaffa – one of the central symbols of the story – the symbol of sub conscience, passion, lunacy, was created by designer Tali Itzhaki as a beautiful backdrop, serving as a reflection of the mental world of the characters, who are gradually engulfed and imprisoned by their madness. The sea, like the entire stage, moves between a shining Israeli light of consciousness, and a Norwegian or Swedish darkening, of a sub conscience remindful of Ibsen, Bergman, or Edvard Munch"

And on the production of Inherit the Wind, which she designed for the Haifa Theatre, theatre critic Elyakim Yaron wrote in the same paper:  "It is impossible to imagine Gazit's direction of the play, especially in those parts in which a huge theatrical and spectacular momentum is required, without his fertile cooperation with his stage designer, Tali Itzhaki. Her impressive stage design indeed enables a show of such theatrical extension. Her design managed to successfully create a magnificent integration of that atmosphere of distinct American background, and a clear conception of a huge and impressive space. The aesthetic neatness of the set, which wonderfully combines the brown wooden colors with the classical white structure of columns and banisters, is a delight for the eye. And indeed the director uses this framework well, when he sits on the upper balconies the town's citizents attending the trial. And this excellent stage picture is yet complemented by the beautiful costumes."

Gallery

Selected works for the theatre: set, costume, puppets and masks

Select publications

 Tal Itzhaki, Beyond Concrete, American Theatre 2008.
 Tal Itzhaki,Ways of Unseeing: Glass Walls on the Main Stage, in: Susan Haedicke, Dee Heddon, A. Oz, E J Westlake (eds.), Political Performances: Theory and Practice, New York & Amsterdam, 2009.
 Tal Itzhaki, Theatre and Travel, Teatron 2010.(Hebrew)
 Tal Itzhaki Notes Concerning the PQ Changes, in: Sodja Lotker (ed.), Transformations of Prague Quadrennial from 1999 to 2015, Prague, 2017

References

External links
 Tal Itzhaki, Associate Professor (artist), University of Haifa (1996-2004)

1956 births
Living people
Israeli Jews
People from Tel Aviv